Reuben Shalu Gabriel (born 25 September 1990) is a Nigerian professional footballer who plays as a defensive midfielder.

Club career

Nigeria
Gabriel was born in Kaduna. In his country he played for Kaduna United FC, Enyimba International F.C. and Kano Pillars FC.

In October 2012, Gabriel was named both the Player of the Year and the National Team Player of the Year at the 2012 League Bloggers Awards (LBA), held in Lagos.

Kilmarnock
On 2 April 2013, Gabriel joined Scottish Premier League side Kilmarnock as a free agent, signing a three-year contract. He made his debut for his new team on 29 November, in a Scottish Cup tie against Dundee United where he conceded a penalty in a 2–5 away defeat.

In November 2013, Reuben demanded to leave Kilmarnock in the January 2014 window. He was released in January, after the club accepted his request.

Waasland-Beveren
In January 2014, Reuben went on trial with Tottenham Hotspur in the Premier League. However, nothing came of it, and he joined Belgian Pro League side Waasland-Beveren on a one-and-a-half-year contract late in the month.

Al-Ain
On 3 September 2021, Gabriel joined Al-Ain.

International career
Gabriel made his debut for Nigeria in March 2010, in a 5–2 win against the Democratic Republic of the Congo. Previously, he was a member of the national B-team that won the 2010 WAFU Nations Cup.

Reuben scored his first international on 9 June 2012, netting the opener in an eventual 1–1 away draw against Malawi for the 2014 FIFA World Cup qualifiers. He was called to the 23-man squad for the 2013 Africa Cup of Nations, being an unused player as the Super Eagles won the tournament in South Africa.

Reuben was also selected to the 2014 World Cup by coach Stephen Keshi. He made his debut in the tournament on 30 June, replacing injured Ogenyi Onazi in the 59th minute of an eventual 0–2 loss to France for the round-of-16.

References

External links

1990 births
Living people
Sportspeople from Kaduna
Nigerian footballers
Association football midfielders
Nigeria Professional Football League players
Kaduna United F.C. players
Enyimba F.C. players
Kano Pillars F.C. players
Scottish Professional Football League players
Kilmarnock F.C. players
Belgian Pro League players
S.K. Beveren players
Primeira Liga players
Saudi First Division League players
Saudi Professional League players
Boavista F.C. players
Slovak Super Liga players
AS Trenčín players
Veikkausliiga players
Najran SC players
Abha Club players
Al-Fayha FC players
Al-Ain FC (Saudi Arabia) players
Kuopion Palloseura players
Nigeria international footballers
2013 Africa Cup of Nations players
2014 FIFA World Cup players
Africa Cup of Nations-winning players
Nigerian expatriate footballers
Expatriate footballers in Scotland
Expatriate footballers in Belgium
Expatriate footballers in Portugal
Expatriate footballers in Slovakia
Expatriate footballers in Finland
Expatriate footballers in Saudi Arabia
Nigerian expatriate sportspeople in Portugal
Nigerian expatriate sportspeople in Slovakia
Nigerian expatriate sportspeople in Finland
Nigerian expatriate sportspeople in Saudi Arabia
Nigerian expatriate sportspeople in Scotland
Nigerian expatriate sportspeople in Belgium
Nigerian expatriate sportspeople in the United Kingdom